Urbano Zea Salcido (6 August 1941 – 30 March 2022) was a Mexican basketball player. He competed in the men's tournament at the 1960 Summer Olympics.

References

External links
 

1941 births
2022 deaths
Mexican men's basketball players
1963 FIBA World Championship players
Olympic basketball players of Mexico
Basketball players at the 1960 Summer Olympics
Basketball players from Chihuahua
Sportspeople from Ciudad Juárez